Meroctena is a genus of moths of the family Crambidae. The genus was first described by Julius Lederer in 1863.

Species
Meroctena dichocrosialis Hampson, 1899
Meroctena staintonii Lederer, 1863
Meroctena tullalis (Walker, 1859)
Meroctena zygialis Druce, 1899

References

Spilomelinae
Crambidae genera
Taxa named by Julius Lederer